Zero Days is a 2016 American documentary film directed by Alex Gibney. It was selected to compete for the Golden Bear at the 66th Berlin International Film Festival.

Synopsis
Zero Days covers the phenomenon surrounding the Stuxnet computer virus and the development of the malware software known as "Olympic Games." It concludes with discussion over follow-up cyber plan Nitro Zeus and the Iran Nuclear Deal.

Interviewees
David E. Sanger		
Emad Kiyaei, Director External Affairs at the American Iranian Council (AIC),	
Eric Chien (Symantec)
Liam O'Murchu (Symantec)
Colonel Gary D. Brown, staff judge advocate of the United States Cyber Command
Gary Samore		
Chris Inglis, NSA Deputy Director 2006-2014	
Amos Yadlin		
Yossi Melman		
Yuval Steinitz		
Eugene Kaspersky		
Vitaly Kamluk	
Michael Hayden		
Olli Heinonen
Ralph Langner, German control system security consultant
Richard A. Clarke	
Rolf Mowatt-Larssen
Seán Paul McGurk, Department of Homeland Security Director of Cybersecurity 2008-2011	
Sergey Ulasen (Kaspersky Lab Belarus)

Reception
Review aggregator Rotten Tomatoes collected 66 reviews as of May 6, 2017, of which 91% were positive. The site's consensus states: "Factors beyond Gibney's control prevent Zero Days from offering a comprehensive look at its subject, but the partial picture that emerges remains as frightening as it is impossible to ignore." Metacritic gave the film a score of 77/100 based on 23 critics.

Writing for RogerEbert.com, Godfrey Cheshire praised Zero Days as "Easily the most important film anyone has released this year, it is a documentary that deserves to be seen by every sentient citizen of this country—and indeed the world."

Accolades
Zero Days was among 15 films shortlisted for the Academy Award for Best Feature Documentary, but ultimately did not receive an Oscar nomination. The film won a documentary film Peabody Award in 2017 and was nominated for Best Documentary Screenplay from the Writers Guild of America.

Release
Zero Days was released digitally on Amazon Video and iTunes on December 6, 2016, broadcast on BBC Four in the Storyville strand in the UK on January 16, 2017, and DVD on January 17, 2017.

See also
 Not for the Faint of Heart: Lessons in Courage, Power and Persistence
 The Pragmatic Entente: Israeli-Iranian Relations, 1948-1988

References

External links
 
 

2016 films
2016 documentary films
American documentary films
2010s English-language films
Films directed by Alex Gibney
Documentary films about cyberwarfare
Cyberattacks on energy sector
Cyberwarfare in Iran
Documentary films about Iran
Nuclear program of Iran
Peabody Award-winning broadcasts
Works about computer hacking
2010s American films